The Geoagiu (Hungarian: Gyógy-patak or Diódi-patak) is a right tributary of the river Mureș in Transylvania, Romania. It discharges into the Mureș in Teiuș.

Tributaries
The following rivers are tributaries to the river Geoagiu:
Left: Tomești, Geoagel

References

Rivers of Romania
Rivers of Alba County